QUI, or qui, may refer to:

Queen's University of Ireland
Qui ?, an album by French-Armenian singer Charles Aznavour
Qui...?, a 1989 new beat hit single by the Brussels Sound Revolution, satirizing Belgian politician Paul Vandenboeynants.
Qui (band), an American independent rock band
Qui, Iran, a village in Zanjan Province, Iran
qui, the ISO 639-3 code for the Quileute language, spoken in Washington state, United States
QUI, the National Rail code for Quintrell Downs railway station, Cornwall, UK

See also